The men's 800 metre freestyle event at the 2001 World Aquatics Championships took place 24 July. The heats took place 23 July, and the final was held on 24 July.

Records
Prior to the competition, the existing world and championship records were as follows.

The following record was established during the competition:

Results

Heats

Final

Key: WR = World record

References
Results from swimrankings.net Retrieved 2012-08-18

World Aquatics Championships
Swimming at the 2001 World Aquatics Championships